The 1988–89 Ronchetti Cup was the 18th edition of FIBA Europe's second-tier competition for women's basketball clubs, running from 12 October 1988 to 22 March 1989. CSKA Moscow defeated Deborah Milan in the final to win its second title. It was the last of five editions in a row won by Soviet clubs.

Qualifying round

First round

Group stage

Group A

Group B

Group C

Group D

Semifinals

Final

References

1988-89
1988–89 in European women's basketball